Baegunsan is a mountain between the provinces of Gangwon-do and Chungcheongbuk-do in South Korea. Its area extends into the cities of Wonju and Jecheon.

See also
List of mountains in Korea

Notes

References

Wonju
Jecheon
Mountains of North Chungcheong Province
Mountains of Gangwon Province, South Korea
Mountains of South Korea
One-thousanders of South Korea